The Yucaipa Companies, LLC is an American private equity firm founded in 1986 by Ronald Burkle. It specializes in private equity and venture capital, with a focus on middle-market companies, growth capital, industry consolidation, leveraged buyouts, and turnaround investments. It generally invests $25–$300 million in companies with $300–$500 million in revenues.

Yucaipa has a history of leveraged buyouts in supermarket and grocery chains, beginning with Jurgensen's Markets in 1986. After several standalone investments in the late 1980s, it went on to lead the consolidation of West Coast retail that occurred during the 1990s due in part to the rise of discount centers like Wal-Mart. In October 2014, The Yucaipa Companies acquired British retailer Tesco's Fresh & Easy chain five years after it had entered the U.S. market.

History 

 1987: Food 4 Less grocery franchise of Kansas City acquired for $35 million
 1989: Boys Markets acquired for $375 million
 1991: Alpha Beta California supermarket chain acquired for $271 million
 1994: Smitty's Phoenix-based supermarket operator acquired for $138 million
 1994: Ralphs Grocery Co. Southern California supermarket chain acquired for $1.5 billion; Alpha Beta and Boys outlets subsequently rebranded as Ralphs

 1997: Ralphs/Food 4 Less merged with Fred Meyer
 1998: Fred Meyer sold to Kroger for $8 billion
 1995: Dominick's, a Chicago-based grocery store chain, acquired for $750 million
 1998: Dominick's sold for $1.85 billion to Safeway
 1999: invests $3 million in GameSpy, and $25 million in Cyrk, Inc.
 2004:	TDS Logistics purchased by Yucaipa (according to TDS Logistics site )
 2004: Yucaipa along with Piccadily Restaurant Investment Group, LLC a special purpose entity formed by Ramy El-Batrawi acquires Piccadilly Restaurants
 2005: Yucaipa becomes the majority shareholder in Aloha Airlines in a $100 million bid to purchase the airline.
 2005: acquires 40% stake in Pathmark for $150 million
2007: acquires stake in The Great Atlantic & Pacific Tea Company as part of GA&P's acquisition of Pathmark
 2008: acquires stake in Barnes & Noble
 2009: Yucaipa doubles its stake in Barnes & Noble to 16.8% during e-reader war with Amazon.com, citing corporate governance concerns 
 2012: divests Barnes & Noble shares to Yucaipa investors
 2011: increases stake in The Great Atlantic & Pacific Tea Company as part of a restructuring following its bankruptcy
 2012: Stake in Barneys New York
 2014: Acquired Fresh & Easy from Tesco

Aloha Airlines purchase 
In February 2006, Aloha Airlines was taken into private ownership by Yucaipa Companies and Aloha Investment Group, LLC head by Ramy El-Batrawi. After 61 years in business, passenger operations shut down on March 31, 2008, due to rising fuel prices, new competition for inter-island travel, a tightening credit market, and dwindling interest by investors in the airline industry.

In January 2011 Yucaipa won federal Bankruptcy Court approval to buy the Aloha name and other intellectual property for $1.5 million with a stipulation that it not resell the name to Mesa Air Group, the parent of go! Mokulele. It was unknown what the plans were for the Aloha name.

 
Caught in the pink slime controversy and with interim chief executive Ron Allen citing "ongoing media attention" that has "dramatically reduced the demand for all ground beef products" in 2012, Yucaipa's AFA declared Chapter 11 bankruptcy. Based in King of Prussia, Pennsylvania, AFA at the time the controversy broke had about 850 employees and annual revenues of $958 million.

Controversy
Former U.S. President Bill Clinton, a close friend of founder Ron Burkle, was an advisor to Yucaipa. From 2003 to 2006, Bill and Hillary Clintons' tax returns show total Yucaipa partnership income of $12.5 million. According to the 2007 summary provided by Hillary Clinton's presidential campaign, the Clintons earned $2.75 million from the Yucaipa partnership.

References 

1986 establishments in California
Aloha Airlines
Barnes & Noble
American companies established in 1986
Financial services companies established in 1986
Companies based in Los Angeles
GameSpy
Holding companies of the United States
Private equity firms of the United States
The Great Atlantic & Pacific Tea Company
Venture capital firms of the United States